Karnalovo is a village in Petrich Municipality, in Blagoevgrad Province, Bulgaria.

References

Villages in Blagoevgrad Province